Khaled Al-Shemmari  is a Kuwaiti football goalkeeper who played for Kuwait in the 1984 Asian Cup.

Honours 

Asian Cup:
Third Place : 1984

References

External links
Stats

Kuwaiti footballers
Kuwait international footballers
1984 AFC Asian Cup players
1988 AFC Asian Cup players
Living people
Asian Games medalists in football
Footballers at the 1986 Asian Games
Asian Games bronze medalists for Kuwait
Association football goalkeepers
Year of birth missing (living people)
Medalists at the 1986 Asian Games
Kuwait SC players
Kuwait Premier League players